Zodarion italicum is a European ant-eating spider. Like the closely related Z. hamatum, it is nocturnal and captures various ant species. Z. italicum seems to be specialized in Formicinae ants. Both species are generalized mimics of orange-dark brown ants, such as Lasius emarginatus.

It is found in France, Corsica, Italy, the Balkans and Turkey. It was first discovered in Britain in 1984, where it is widespread in the Grays area of Essex and occurs among rubble on waste ground and in chalk quarries, often with the ant Lasius niger.

References

italicum
Spiders of Europe
Arthropods of Turkey
Spiders described in 1868